Mike Mekelburg (born February 20, 1975) is a retired American soccer midfielder who played professionally in the USISL and National Professional Soccer League.

Youth
Mekelburg grew up in Tampa, Florida, playing for Tampa's Black Watch S.C.  In 1993, he graduated from George D. Chamberlain High School where he played on the boys' soccer team.  In 1992, the Chamberlain soccer team finished runner-up to Killian in the Florida 4A high school soccer championship.  Mekelburg attended the University of South Florida, playing for the men's soccer team from 1993 to 1996.  He was a 1996 First Team All American.

Professional
In December 1996, the Tampa Bay Terror selected Mekelburg in the National Professional Soccer League draft.  In February 1997, the Tampa Bay Mutiny picked him in the first round (eighth overall) of the 1997 MLS College Draft.  Mekelburg signed with the Mutiny, but injuries kept him off the field.  The team waived him on June 24, 1997.  In July, Dallas Sidekicks then chose Mekelburg in the Continental Indoor Soccer League Supplemental Draft after Mekelburg had trained with them for several weeks.  The Sidekicks did not sign him and Mekelburg joined the Baltimore Spirit of the National Professional Soccer League in September 1997.  In 1998, he played for the Milwaukee Rampage in the USISL A-League.  On January 28, 1999, he signed a two-year contract with the Charleston Battery.  On July 24, 1999, the Battery traded Mekelburg to the Raleigh Capital Express in exchange for Edmundo Rodriguez.

References

External links
 Charleston Battery: Mike Mekelburg

1978 births
Living people
George D. Chamberlain High School alumni
American soccer coaches
American soccer players
Baltimore Spirit players
Milwaukee Rampage players
Charleston Battery players
National Professional Soccer League (1984–2001) players
Raleigh (Capital) Express players
South Florida Bulls men's soccer players
A-League (1995–2004) players
Tampa Bay Mutiny players
Tampa Bay Mutiny draft picks
Soccer players from Tampa, Florida
All-American men's college soccer players
Association football midfielders